Pelagio Baltasar Luna (6 January 1867 – June 25, 1919) was an Argentine politician of the Radical Civic Union. He was elected Vice President in 1916.

Born in La Rioja, Argentina, where his father was founder of the Radical Civic Union, Luna  graduated from the University of Buenos Aires at the age of 22. He returned to La Rioja and worked as a lawyer then entered the judicial system, serving as a judge. He also taught literature at the National School of La Rioja.

Luna joined the Radical Youth in 1889 and took part in the armed revolution the following year. He was part of the National Convention of November 1892. He was a candidate for National Deputy in 1912 and for governor of La Rioja in 1913, without success.

In 1916 Luna was elected vice president on Hipólito Yrigoyen's ticket, as the first elected vice president under the Sáenz Peña Law, serving until his death in 1919. As President of the Senate, he helped create the National Library of Argentina, serving as its first president.

References

Bibliography 
 
 

Radical Civic Union politicians
19th-century Argentine judges
Vice presidents of Argentina
1867 births
1919 deaths